Randal Sean McLelland (born September 17, 1985) is an International Skeet shooter who competed in the 2008 Summer Olympics. 
 
McLelland began shooting clay targets when he was 14, and he credits Steve Schultz for being the most helpful and influential person in his development and upbringing in the clay target sports. McLelland graduated from Sharyland High School in 2004 and then graduated from Lindenwood University in St. Charles, Mo. in 2008. During his time there, he majored in Business and shot for the nationally ranked Lindenwood University Shotgun team for three National Championship team wins.

References

1985 births
Living people
Lindenwood University alumni
American male sport shooters
Skeet shooters
Olympic shooters of the United States
Shooters at the 2008 Summer Olympics